Jwala Devi Temple, and variations, may refer to:

Jwala Ji Temple (Kashmir)
Jwala Devi Temple (Uttar Pradesh)